Corey Page  (born 27 March 1971)  is an Australian film and television actor. He had a leading role in the television series Heartbreak High in Australia. Additionally, he was a series regular in the US television series The City from 1995–96.

Page also co-starred in the MTV/Paramount feature film, Dead Man on Campus in 1998, and supporting role in the independent film The Road Home.

Most recently, Page served as on-set drama coach for the independent Australian film Newcastle, directed by US writer/director, Dan Castle and as Matthew Webster in the 2011 Australian film Wrath.

References

External links

1975 births
Australian male film actors
Australian male television actors
Living people
People from Broken Hill, New South Wales
20th-century Australian male actors
21st-century Australian male actors